Nugguren is a lake in the municipality of Kongsvinger in Innlandet county, Norway. The lake flows out into a very short channel before emptying into the river Glomma.

See also
List of lakes in Norway

References

Kongsvinger
Lakes of Innlandet